Gorka is both a given name and a surname, the Basque form of the given name George. Notable people with the name include:

Given name 

Gorka Brit, (born 1978), Spanish footballer
Gorka Elustondo (born 1987), Spanish footballer
Gorka González (born 1977), Spanish cyclist
Gorka Iraizoz (born 1981), Spanish footballer
Gorka Izagirre (born 1987), Spanish cyclist
Gorka Larrea, (born 1984), Spanish footballer
Gorka Pintado (born 1979), Spanish footballer
Gorka Verdugo (born 1978), Spanish cyclist
Gorka Márquez (born 1990), Spanish Dancer

Surname 
John Gorka (born 1958), American folk musician
Mickey Gorka (born 1972), Israeli basketball player and coach
Sebastian Gorka (born 1970), British-American national security advisor
Walter S. Gorka (1922–1942), United States Navy sailor and Air Medal recipient

See also

Górka (disambiguation), a number of villages in Poland
Gorka, a town in the county of Kreis Koschmin, Poland
Gorkha Kingdom
Gurkha
Gorka-suit, a Russian combat uniform designed specifically for mountainous and other harsh environments
FC Energiya-TEC-5 Druzhny, a Belarusian football club founded as FC Belarus Maryina Gorka
Gorkamorka, a tabletop wargame
USS Walter S. Gorka (APD-114), originally classified (DE-604), a United States Navy high-speed transport in commission from 1945 to 1947
George (disambiguation)
Gorakhpur division, Uttar Pradesh, India
Gorakhpur district, within Gorakhpur division
Gorakhpur, administrative headquarters of the division and district

Basque masculine given names